Stachyanthus is a genus of plants in the family Icacinaceae. It has about four species.

List of selected species
Stachyanthus cuneatus Engl.
Stachyanthus donisii (Boutique) Boutique
Stachyanthus occidentalis (Keay & J.Miège) Boutique
Stachyanthus zenkeri Engl.

References

Icacinaceae
Asterid genera